Lists of Atlantic Records artists include artists who record or have recorded for Atlantic Records.

 Atlantic Records discography
 List of Atlantic Records artists

See also
 Atlantic Records